Kendriya Vidyalaya NTPC Diviyapur is a CBSE board affiliated  school upto Intermediate, located at Alok Nagar in the campus of National Capital Power Station Dibiyapur district Auraiya, Uttar Pradesh, India. It is popular in whole Western Uttar Pradesh.

History
It is a project Vidyalaya sponsored by National Thermal Power Corporation an undertaking of the Indian Government. This Vidyalaya was opened by Kendriya Vidyalaya Sangathan, in December 1987, with classes 1 to 7 and initial enrollment of 77 Students. At present it has up to 12 standard with Science and Humanity stream. The existing strength of the Vidyalaya is 550.

References

Kendriya Vidyalayas in Uttar Pradesh
Primary schools in Uttar Pradesh
High schools and secondary schools in Uttar Pradesh
Dibiyapur
Educational institutions established in 1987
1987 establishments in Uttar Pradesh